The Catholic Sun is the official newspaper of the Roman Catholic Diocese of Phoenix.  The bishop of the diocese publishes the paper once a month and registered Catholics from central to northern Arizona receive it. With a circulation that fluctuates between 115,000 and 125,000, The Catholic Sun is the largest Catholic newspaper in the state. The paper was founded in April 1985 under the leadership of Bishop Thomas J. O’Brien and Christopher Gunty. It has won many national and local awards from the Catholic Press Association,  the Associated Church Press  and the Arizona Newspaper Association.

External links
 The Catholic Sun
 The Catholic Sun, Syracuse, NY
 The Diocese of Phoenix
 The Catholic Press Association
 The Associated Church Press
 The Arizona Newspaper Association
 Echo Media

Catholic newspapers published in the United States
Newspapers published in Arizona
Catholic Church in Arizona
Publications established in 1985
1985 establishments in Arizona